The M48 is a short metropolitan route in Greater Johannesburg, South Africa.

Route 
The M48 begins at the M31 and ends at the M47.

References 

Streets and roads of Johannesburg
Metropolitan routes in Johannesburg